The 2007 WGC-Bridgestone Invitational was a golf tournament that was contested from August 2–5, 2007 over the South Course at Firestone Country Club in Akron, Ohio. It was the ninth WGC-Bridgestone Invitational tournament, and the third of three World Golf Championships events held in 2007.

World number 1 Tiger Woods won the tournament for a second hat-trick at the Invitational in his career, and claimed his 14th World Golf Championships title, which was his sixth Invitational title. He won over Justin Rose and Rory Sabbatini by eight strokes, with Woods shooting an 8-under-par 272.

Field
1. Playing members of the 2006 United States and European Ryder Cup teams
Chad Campbell, Paul Casey (3,4,5), Stewart Cink (2,3,4), Darren Clarke, Chris DiMarco (2,4), Luke Donald (3,4), Sergio García (3,4), Pádraig Harrington (3,4,5), J. J. Henry, David Howell, Zach Johnson (3,4,5), Robert Karlsson (3,4), Paul McGinley, Phil Mickelson (2,3,4,5), Colin Montgomerie (3,4,5), José María Olazábal (3,4), Henrik Stenson (3,4,5), Vaughn Taylor, David Toms (2,3,4), Scott Verplank (2,3,4,5), Lee Westwood (3,4), Brett Wetterich (3,4), Tiger Woods (2,3,4,5)
Jim Furyk (2,3,4,5) did not play.

2. Playing members of the 2005 United States and International Presidents Cup teams
Stuart Appleby (3,4), Ángel Cabrera (3,4,5), Michael Campbell, Tim Clark (3,4), Fred Funk, Retief Goosen (3,4), Mark Hensby, Trevor Immelman (3,4), Justin Leonard, Peter Lonard, Davis Love III (3,4,5), Nick O'Hern (3,4,5), Kenny Perry, Adam Scott (3,4,5), Vijay Singh (3,4,5), Mike Weir (3,4)
Fred Couples did not play.

3. Top 50 players from the Official World Golf Rankings two weeks prior to event
Robert Allenby (4), Stephen Ames (4), Aaron Baddeley (4,5), K. J. Choi (4,5), Ernie Els (4,5), Niclas Fasth (4,5), Retief Goosen (4,5), Richard Green (4), Anders Hansen (4,5), Charles Howell III (4,5), Shingo Katayama, Jerry Kelly (4), Arron Oberholser (4), Geoff Ogilvy (4), Rod Pampling (4), Carl Pettersson (4), Ian Poulter (4), John Rollins (4), Andres Romero (4,5), Justin Rose (4,5), Rory Sabbatini (4,5), Richard Sterne (4,5), Steve Stricker (4), Boo Weekley (4,5)

4. Top 50 players from the Official World Golf Rankings one week prior to event

5. Tournament winners of worldwide events since the prior year's tournament with an Official World Golf Ranking Strength of Field Rating of 115 points or more
Woody Austin, Brian Bateman, Mark Calcavecchia, Joe Durant, Paul Goydos, Anton Haig, Grégory Havret, Charley Hoffman, Raphaël Jacquelin, José Manuel Lara, Liang Wenchong, Hunter Mahan, Troy Matteson, John Senden, Jeev Milkha Singh, Graeme Storm, Nick Watney, Mark Wilson, Yang Yong-eun

6. The winner of selected tournaments from each of the following tours:
Japan Golf Tour: Japan Golf Tour Championship (2007) – Shingo Katayama, qualified in category 3
PGA Tour of Australasia: Australian PGA Championship (2006) – Nick O'Hern, qualified in categories 2, 3, 4, and 5
Sunshine Tour: Vodacom Championship (2007) – Richard Sterne,  qualified in categories 3, 4, and 5
Asian Tour: Volvo Masters of Asia (2006) – Thongchai Jaidee

Round summaries

First round

Second round

Third round

Final round

Scorecard

Cumulative tournament scores, relative to par

Source:

References

External links
Full results

WGC Invitational
WGC-Bridgestone Invitational
WGC-Bridgestone Invitational
WGC-Bridgestone Invitational